The SIAI-Marchetti SM.101 was a 1940s Italian single-engined light transport cabin monoplane designed and built by SIAI-Marchetti.

Development
The SM.101 was a single-engined low-wing cantilever monoplane with a tailwheel landing gear with retractable main gear. It had an enclosed cabin for two crew and six passengers and was powered by a nose-mounted 235 hp (175 kW) Walter Bora radial engine. The prototype and only SM.101 first flew on 20 December 1947 but the company soon decided that a single-engined passenger transport was not likely to sell and the company developed the design with two engines as the SM.102.

Specifications (SM.101)

See also

References

Further reading
 

Savoia-Marchetti aircraft
1940s Italian civil utility aircraft
Low-wing aircraft
Single-engined tractor aircraft
Aircraft first flown in 1947